Mandla Jeffrey Msibi (born 14 December 1975) is a South African politician and educator who has been a Member of the Mpumalanga Provincial Legislature since May 2019 as well as the Mpumalanga MEC for Co-operative Governance and Traditional Affairs since October 2022. He was the Mpumalanga MEC for Agriculture, Rural Development, Land and Environmental Affairs  from February 2021 until his dismissal in October 2021 and before that, he was the MEC for Cooperative Governance and Traditional Affairs from May 2019 to February 2021. Prior to serving in the legislature, he was the speaker and a councillor in the Mbombela Local Municipality. Msibi is a member of the African National Congress.

On 2 April 2022, he was elected as the provincial treasurer of the ANC in Mpumalanga, despite the ANC's "step aside" rule for all members who have been criminally charged. At the time, Msibi faced charges of murder and attempted murder. He stepped aside from the position on 5 April. In September 2022, the murder charges were provisionally withdrawn.

Early life and education
Msibi was born on 14 December 1975 in Daantjie in the Transvaal Province, now Mpumalanga. He attended Lekazi Central High School. He achieved a senior teacher's diploma from the Elijah Mango College of Education. Msibi obtained a certificate in negotiation skills and basic business skills from the University of Potchefstroom before attaining a certificate in executive leadership from the University of Pretoria.

Career
Msibi was an educator for the education department. He later found employment as a youth commissioner in the office of the Premier of Mpumalanga. In March 2006, he was elected as a councillor in the Mbombela Local Municipality. He took over as the speaker of the municipality following the 2016 municipal elections.

On 22 May 2019, Msibi became a member of the provincial legislature. Premier Refilwe Mtsweni-Tsipane appointed him to the post of MEC for Cooperative Governance and Traditional Affairs. He assumed office on 29 May.

On 24 February 2021, Msibi was moved to the Agriculture, Rural Development, Land and Environmental Affairs portfolio of the executive council.

On 12 October 2021, Mtsweni-Tsipane fired Msibi as MEC for Agriculture, Rural Development, Land and Environmental Affairs as he faced murder and attempted murder charges. He remained as an ordinary ANC member of the provincial legislature.

Provincial treasurer of the ANC 
On 25 March 2022, the provincial African National Congress Women's League in Mpumalanga nominated Msibi for ANC provincial treasurer ahead of the party's provincial elective conference from 1–3 April 2022, despite the party's "step aside" rule for all members with criminal charges to stand back from all party activities until their cases have been resolved. ANC NEC member Dakota Legoete did however say that Msibi was allowed to contest the position at the conference.

On 2 April, Msibi was officially nominated in absentia for the provincial treasurer position. He was elected with 442 votes, defeating Norah Mahlangu who received only 271 votes. He is however ineligible to serve, given the criminal charges against him. The ANC coordinator in the office of the secretary-general, Gwen Ramokgopa, described his election as disappointing as the "step aside" rule had failed to translate to branches and said that the ANC NEC will likely engage with him and possibly ask him to contemplate resigning from the position as Ramokgopa described the newly elected provincial leadership as incomplete and "limping" without him. On 5 April 2022, he stepped aside after the national ANC treasurer-general Paul Mashatile reminded him of the step-aside resolution in a letter dated 3 April.

Return to the provincial executive council 
On 5 September 2022, the NPA provisionally withdrew the murder charges against him, meaning he could assume his duties as ANC provincial treasurer.  He was appointed as MEC for Co-operative Governance and Traditional Affairs on 7 October 2022.

Controversies
In July 2017, Msibi was accused of vandalising a vehicle that belonged to a councillor. He was then accused of breaking into and vandalising a house in August. Msibi was also accused of attempted murder and the assault of a person who was left partially disabled after the ordeal. He was also accused of wrecking a BMW X5. In February 2018, he was arrested in Pienaar outside Mbombela for malicious damage to property after he allegedly retaliated against community members who accused him of being corrupt.

2021 murder and attempted murder charges
Msibi and his co-accused, Njabulo Mkhonto and Anele Sonke Mnisi, are currently facing two counts of murder and one of attempted murder relating to the fatal shooting of Dingaan Ngwenya and Sindela Lubisi and the wounding of a third person at the Cayotes Shisa Nyama in Nelspruit on 22 August 2021. On 11 October 2021, Msibi handed himself over to police and has since remained in police custody. He and his co-accused appeared in the Nelspruit Magistrate's Court on 12 October 2021 There was a bomb scare at Msibi's bail hearing in court on 13 October. He was later granted bail on 19 October. On 24 February, the Nelspruit Magistrate's Court postponed the trial to 1 March 2022 as to give the National Prosecuting Authority (NPA) enough time to establish its charge sheet against Msibi and his co-accused.

On 5 September 2022, the murder charges against Msibi were provisionally withdrawn.

References

External links

Living people
1975 births
African National Congress politicians
21st-century South African politicians
People from Mpumalanga
North-West University alumni
University of Pretoria alumni
People from Mbombela
People from Mbombela Local Municipality
Members of the Mpumalanga Provincial Legislature